Halwai is an Indian caste whose traditional occupation was confectionery and sweet-making. The name is derived from the word Halwa plough.

Balarama is the celebrated plougher so called Halwahi or Halwai, one of the pillars of agriculture along with livestock with whom Krishna is associated with. The plough is Balarama's weapon. In the Bhagavata Purana, he uses it to fight demons, dig a way for Yamuna river to come closer to Vrindavan and pull the entire capital of Hastinapura into the Ganges river.

Baba Ganinath Govindji is the kul Guru (school) of Halwai caste.

Origins
In parts of Uttar Pradesh, some believe that they have descended from a man by the name 'Bhalandan.' This Bhalandan came into being due to the will of the Hindu god Brahma. This individual married a woman named Marutwati. Their son was an individual who was named Vatsa Priti. One of the latter's descendants, an individual called Modan, took to making sweetmeats.

The community set up its own association, the Kanyakubja Vaishya Halwai Mahasabha, which was established in Varanasi in the early part of the 1900s.

See also
 Chandu Halwai

References

Social groups of Pakistan
Bania communities
Social groups of Uttar Pradesh
Social groups of Madhya Pradesh
Social groups of Rajasthan
Social groups of Bihar
Social groups of Odisha